The 1965 CONCACAF Championship, the second edition of the CONCACAF Championship, was held in Guatemala from 28 March to 11 April.

Qualifying Tournament

Caribbean zone

Jamaica, Trinidad, Dominican Republic withdrew from qualifying due to a schedule clash with qualification for the 1966 FIFA World Cup.

Hosts of the final tournament, Guatemala refused to grant the Cubans visas to visit the country.

Cuba complained to Helmut Käser, FIFA's General Secretary requesting for FIFA not to recognise CONCACAF. Käser stated that FIFA could not do so and referred the issue of Guatemalan visas for the Cubans to CONCACAF. As they were not able to enter the competition, Cuba withdrew.

Haiti and Netherlands Antilles automatically qualified for the final round.

Central American zone

Panama withdrew prior to the qualifying tournament beginning.

North zone

|}

United States withdrew. Mexico automatically qualified.

Venues

Final tournament

Notes

References

CONCACAF Championship
International association football competitions hosted by Guatemala
Championship
1964–65 in Mexican football
1964–65 in Honduran football
1964–65 in Guatemalan football
1964–65 in Salvadoran football
1965 in Haiti
March 1965 sports events in North America
April 1965 sports events in North America
Sports competitions in Guatemala City
20th century in Guatemala City